Blind Brook may refer to:

 Blind Brook High School
 Blind Brook School District